Hare Park & Crofton railway station, sometimes just known as Crofton railway station, was a station located on the West Riding and Grimsby Railway, this section now known as the Wakefield Line. The station was opened in November 1885 and closed on 4 February 1952.

This site, in the West Yorkshire transport plan, has been suggested for a new station with the village of Crofton now having a population of over 6,000 as well as this, the proposal of a new railway station further down the line closer to New Crofton is cited in the Crofton village plan, to hopefully remove congestion in the village, and cut down on carbon emissions.

References

External links
 Hare Park & Crofton station on navigable 1947 O. S. map

Disused railway stations in Wakefield
Former West Riding and Grimsby Railway stations
Railway stations in Great Britain opened in 1885
Railway stations in Great Britain closed in 1952